The W.A. McNeill House at 1282 C Ave. East in Oskaloosa, Iowa was built in 1909.  It was a work of architects Hallett & Rawson and of William Zitteral.  It has also been known as the Abbott House.  It was listed on the National Register of Historic Places in 1999.

It is operated as a bed & breakfast known as the McNeill Stone Mansion.

References

External links
History Bed & Breakfast

National Register of Historic Places in Mahaska County, Iowa
Houses on the National Register of Historic Places in Iowa
Colonial Revival architecture in Iowa
Mission Revival architecture in Iowa
Houses completed in 1909
Houses in Mahaska County, Iowa
1909 establishments in Iowa